Parmotrema  is a species of saxicolous lichen in the family Parmeliaceae. Described as new to science in 2005, it is found in Rwanda.

See also
List of Parmotrema species

References

afrocetratum
Lichen species
Lichens described in 2005
Lichens of Africa
Taxa named by John Alan Elix